Dr. Shalini Prasad is a biological engineer, Cecil H. and Ida Green Professor of Systems Biology Science, and head of the Bioengineering Department at The University of Texas at Dallas. She was elected to the American Institute for Medical and Biological Engineering College of Fellows in February 2022 "for pioneering contributions in engineering sweat wearables for disease tracking and management for chronic diseases and prognostic monitoring in pandemics."

Research 
In 2017, Prasad led a team of bioengineers to create a device that could detect elevated blood-sugar from sweat. In 2020, she led a study to develop an assay that could be used to detect and measure the concentration of THC from cannabis in saliva. In 2021, Prasad developed a biosensor, which uses the same technology as the sweat analysis device from 2017, with the addition that the device can now detect cortisol.

Entrepreneurship 
In 2014, Shalini Prasad and Sriram Muthukumar cofounded the company EnLiSense LLC, which develops biosensors such as their EnLiSense sensor technology.

References

External links
 Faculty website

Year of birth missing (living people)
Living people
American bioengineers
University of Texas at Dallas faculty